"もしも願いが．．．" is the 18th single to be released by Nami Tamaki. It is also being used as the image song for the Nintendo Wii Version of VALHALLA KNIGHTS. 
It is also Nami's first ballad single since 2007. This single sold out 3,408 copies for first week and rank at #20 on Oricon weekly chart.

Music video 
The music video features Nami walking down the streets of Japan, as well as inside a room with a window overlooking the city.

Single versions 

The single comes in 3 different versions. A CD+Calendar Version and a CD+DVD Version and a CD Version.

References

External links
 http://www.tamaki-nami.net/
 https://web.archive.org/web/20090610040000/http://www.namitamaki73.net/

2009 singles
Nami Tamaki songs
2009 songs
Universal Music Japan singles